Reece Dunn  (born 19 September 1995) is a British Paralympic swimmer. He represented Great Britain at the 2020 Summer Paralympics.

Career
Dunn was named the World Disabled Swimmer of the Year in 2019.

Dunn, who is diagnosed with autism, represented Great Britain at the 2020 Summer Paralympics where he won a gold medal in the 200 metre freestyle and a silver medal in the 100 metre butterfly S14 events. He also competed in the men's 200 metre individual medley SM14 event where he finished with a world record time of 2:08.02 and won a gold medal. He competed in the 100 metre backstroke S14 event and won a bronze medal.

Dunn was appointed Member of the Order of the British Empire (MBE) in the 2022 New Year Honours for services to swimming.

References

External links
 
 

1995 births
Living people
Medalists at the World Para Swimming Championships
Paralympic swimmers of Great Britain
Swimmers at the 2020 Summer Paralympics
Medalists at the 2020 Summer Paralympics
Paralympic gold medalists for Great Britain
Paralympic silver medalists for Great Britain
Paralympic bronze medalists for Great Britain
Paralympic medalists in swimming
Sportspeople with autism
World record holders in paralympic swimming
Members of the Order of the British Empire
Sportspeople from Plymouth, Devon
English male freestyle swimmers
British male medley swimmers
British male backstroke swimmers
British male butterfly swimmers
S14-classified Paralympic swimmers
Swimmers at the 2022 Commonwealth Games
Commonwealth Games competitors for England